The 2017 Kyrgyzstan Cup is the 26th season of the Kyrgyzstan Cup knockout tournament. The cup winner qualifies for the 2018 AFC Cup.

The draw of the tournament was held on 4 May 2017.

Round 1
17 May 2017 

"Bostery" (Issyk-Kul) - "Alga-Chui" (Tokmok) 1: 4

"Birimdik" (Sokuluk) - "Kara-Balta-2" (Kara-Balta) 1: 1 Penalty 2: 4

"Yntymak" (Ysyk-Kul) - RUOR (Bishkek) 3: 1

"Semeteus" (Talas) - "Alive" (Kant) 3: 2

"Kok-Zhangak" (Kok-Zhangak) - "Mailuu-Suu" (Mailuu-Suu) 0: 0 Penalty 2: 4

"Bazar-Korgon" (Bazar-Korgon) - "Neftchi-2" (Kochkor-Ata) 3: 0

"Toktogul" (Toktogul) - "Tash-Kumyr" (Tash-Kumyr) 3: 0 (Tech.)

"Batken City" (Batken) - "Aidarken" (Aidarken) 3: 0 (Tech.)

Round 2
23 May 2017 

Semetej - Abdysh-Ata-2 1: 2

24 May 2017 

"Intymak" - "Dordoi 2" 1: 5

"Kara-Balta-2" - "Our" 0: 5

Alga-Chui - Alga-2 2: 0

"Toktogul" - "Energetic" 0: 3 (Tech.)

"Bazar-Korgon" - "Dostuk" 0: 3 (Tech.)

"Mailuu-Suu" - "Jalal-Abad" 3: 0 (Tech.)

25 May 2017

"Batken City" - "Shakhtar" 3: 0 (Tech.)

Round 3
3 June 2017 

"Our" - "Dordoi" 0: 3

"Abdysh-Ata-2" - "Abdysh-Ata" 0: 2

"Mailuu-Suu" - "Alai" 0: 5

4 June 2017 

"Alga-Chui" - "Kara-Balta" 1: 3

"Dordoi-2" - "Alga" 2: 1

Energetik - Neftchi 0: 5

Dostuk - Aldier 3: 0 (Tech.)

"Batken City" - "Alay-2." 0: 3 (Tech.)

Quarter-finals
14 June 2017 

"Alay-2" - "Alay" 5:10

26 July 2017 

"Neftchi" - "Dostuk" 10: 2

"Abdysh-Ata" - "Dordoi-2" 3: 2

27 July 2017 

"Dordoi" - "Kara-Balta" 2: 0

Semifinals
The four winners from the Quarterfinals were drawn into two two-legged ties.

Final

See also
2017 Kyrgyzstan League

External links

Kyrgyzstan Cup News
Kyrgyzstan Cup Results

References

Kyrgyzstan Cup seasons
Kyrgyzstan
Kyrgyzstan Cup